The men's 3000 metres steeplechase at the 1958 European Athletics Championships was held in Stockholm, Sweden, at Stockholms Olympiastadion on 20 and 22 August 1958.

Medalists

Results

Final
22 August

Heats
20 August

Heat 1

Heat 2

Participation
According to an unofficial count, 16 athletes from 14 countries participated in the event.

 (1)
 (2)
 (1)
 (1)
 (1)
 (1)
 (1)
 (1)
 (2)
 (1)
 (1)
 (1)
 (1)
 (1)

References

3000 metres steeplechase
Steeplechase at the European Athletics Championships